{{DISPLAYTITLE:C18H21N3O2}}
The molecular formula C18H21N3O2 (molar mass: 311.378 g/mol) may refer to:

 Lysergic acid hydroxyethylamide
 RS-56812

Molecular formulas